Wendy and Me is an American sitcom that aired on ABC during the 1964–1965 television season, primarily sponsored by Consolidated Cigar's "El Producto". Principally starring George Burns and Connie Stevens, the series was Burns' first major work following the death of his wife and professional partner, Gracie Allen, who had died of a heart attack about a month prior to its debut.

Synopsis

In the series (a slight variation of The George Burns and Gracie Allen Show), Burns plays a somewhat fictionalized version of himself. He is the owner of an apartment building, while Stevens plays his tenant, Wendy Conway. Episodes typically revolved around Wendy pulling Burns into comedic situations mostly involving her husband, played by Ron Harper, and other people in the building. As a regular part of its format, Burns would often break the fourth wall to comment directly to the audience about the episode's events. Burns as landlord would watch his attractive young tenant on what appears to the modern eye to be a surreptitious closed circuit television transmission with hidden cameras (he also accomplished this with his "TV in the den" in later episodes of The Burns and Allen Show). The television was not so much a "surreptitious closed circuit television" but rather a plain old television set where George Burns watched the show "Wendy and Me" along with the television audiences (this was also the case when he watched events unfold on The Burns and Allen Show.)
James T. Callahan appeared in the series as Danny Adams, a playboy friend of Wendy's strait-laced husband. J. Pat O'Malley played the apartment handyman.

As part of Stevens's contract with Warner Bros., Burns agreed to produce another series for her studio, No Time For Sergeants, which appeared before Wendy and Me on ABC's Monday night schedule.

Episode list

References

External links

1960s American sitcoms
1964 American television series debuts
1965 American television series endings
American Broadcasting Company original programming
Black-and-white American television shows
English-language television shows
Fictional married couples
Television duos
Television series by CBS Studios
Television series by Warner Bros. Television Studios